Chandrika Tandon   (née Krishnamurthy) is an Indian American businesswoman and Grammy-nominated artist.

She is chairperson of Tandon Capital Associates, and a member of the board of directors at the Lincoln Center for the Performing Arts and the Berklee Presidential Advisory Council of the Berklee College of Music.

Tandon is also the vice-chairman of the board of trustees at New York University (NYU), chair of the President's Global Council, and chair of the board of the Tandon School of Engineering, which she bought the naming rights to in 2014 for $100 Million. She also serves on the boards of the NYU Stern School of Business and the NYU Langone Health System.

Tandon is the recipient of the Albert Gallatin Medal, the Walter Nichols Medal, and the Polytechnic Medal.

She has released four music albums, earning a Grammy nomination for Soul Call.

She was a speaker at World Hindu Congress 2018.

Early life 
Chandrika was born in Tamil family in Madras now called Chennai. She, along with her sister Indra Nooyi did her schooling in Holy Angels Anglo Indian Higher Secondary School in T.Nagar. Later she earned commerce degrees from Madras Christian College and the Indian Institute of Management, Ahmedabad.

Business career 
Tandon was the first Indian-American woman to be elected partner at McKinsey and Company.

She established Tandon Capital Associates in 1992 and has advised clients including Chase Manhattan Corporation, Comerica, Unibanco (Brazil), Suncorp-Metway Ltd. (Australia), Fleet Financial Group, Bank of America, Rabobank and ABN Amro.

Philanthropy 
American India Foundation – Trustee (2005–2011)

Education and governance 
New York University (NYU), New York, NY, United States
 Vice Chairman, Board of Trustees
 Chairman, NYU President's Global Council
 Member, Board of Overseers, NYU Stern Business School
Yale University, New Haven, CT, United States
 Member, President's Council on International Activities
Berklee College of Music, Boston, MA, United States
 Member, President's Advisory Council
 Founder, Tandon Global Clinics for Contemporary Western music training around the world
Madras Christian College, Chennai, India
 Founder and Contributor, World-Class Business Program

Awards 
 Gallatin Medal – New York University's highest honor for outstanding contributions to society.
 Walter Nichols Medal – for representing the highest ideals of business, service and integrity from NYU Stern.
 Polytechnic Medal – recognizing her efforts for science and engineering.
 Distinguished Alumnus award – from Madras Christian College in 2013.

Discography 
Tandon released her first music album, Soul Call (2009), on her not-for-profit label Soul Chants Music. This was recognized with a  Grammy nomination in contemporary world music. She has released three additional albums: Soul March (2013), Soul Mantra (2014), and Shivoham – The Quest (2017).

References 

Year of birth missing (living people)
Living people
Businesspeople from Chennai
American women chief executives
American women musicians
American musicians of Indian descent
McKinsey & Company
New York University people
American people of Indian Tamil descent
American women philanthropists
Indian emigrants to the United States
21st-century American women